Turkeytown is a small village in South Huntingdon Township, Westmoreland County, Pennsylvania, United States.  It is located near Interstate 70 on Route 31.

External links 
 South Huntingdon website

References

Unincorporated communities in Westmoreland County, Pennsylvania
Unincorporated communities in Pennsylvania